Celatoria is a genus of parasitic flies in the family Tachinidae. Larvae are parasitoids of leaf beetles.

Species
C. bosqi Blanchard, 1937
C. brasiliensis Townsend, 1929
C. compressa (Wulp, 1890)
C. diabroticae (Shimer, 1871)
C. maracasi Thompson, 1968
C. nigricans (Wulp, 1890)
C. setosa (Coquillett, 1895)

References

Diptera of North America
Diptera of South America
Exoristinae
Tachinidae genera
Taxa named by Daniel William Coquillett